Hyvinkää Airfield  is an airfield in Hyvinkää, Finland. It has active gliding and powered flying clubs, and is one of the most active General aviation and gliding airfields in Finland.

The airfield served as the main airport in Finland for some time after the Second World War when Helsinki-Malmi Airport was used by the Allied Commission. Aero OY operated several commuter routes by DC-2. DC-3s never flew routes from Hyvinkää as Aero moved back to Malmi before the pilots were fully trained, but DC-3 training flights were conducted from the airfield.

See also
List of airports in Finland

References

External links

 Hyvinkää Airfield  – Official website 
 VFR Suomi/Finland – Hyvinkää Airfield
 Lentopaikat.net – Hyvinkää Airfield 

Airports in Finland
Airfield
Buildings and structures in Uusimaa